The University of Bristol Students' Union (known as Bristol SU) is the students' union of the University of Bristol, England. It is among the oldest of the UK students' unions and was a founding member of the National Union of Students . The Union is currently based in the Richmond Building on Queens' Road.

History
The original home of the students' union was the Victoria Rooms, which was given to the University in 1920. In 1934, a serious fire destroyed the main hall and electric organ of the building, though many of the other areas were saved from serious damage.  In 1965, the students' union moved to the Richmond Building on Queens' Road.

A fire in the Richmond building on 15 September 2009 caused its closure.  Canoes and other water sporting equipment in a storage area in front of the building caught fire and by 9am was sending "thick black smoke" along the road.

For two days, starting 24 November 2010, a room of the building was occupied by students following the protests in Bristol on the same day. Among other things, the students claimed the union was failing to represent them on issues such as government funding for higher education, and rises to tuition fees. The union was also criticised for not holding an Extraordinary General Meeting (EGM) to discuss these issues. The occupation was ended when the union agreed to call an EGM, which resulted in motions mandating the union to support students opposing tuition fees and cuts in funding to higher education.

An extensive refurbishment of the union building took place in 2014–15. The building was reopened as 'the Richmond Building' in April 2015, and the union was rebranded from 'the University of Bristol Union (UBU)' to 'Bristol SU'.

The University of Bristol and Bristol students' union announced in March 2017 that they would be divesting from fossil fuels. This means they stated as part of a deal that they would dump investments in companies which extract coal and tar sands within a year; review investments in companies extracting oil and gas annually and gradually remove them depending on their polluting potential; and invest three million pounds into a green fund.

Former presidents
Former union presidents have included the broadcaster, Sue Lawley; St Lucia's foreign minister and ambassador to the United Nations, George W. Odlum; and former Liberal Democrat MP and Leader of the Welsh Liberal Democrats, Lembit Öpik.

Facilities and activities

Richmond Building
The union was originally housed in the grand Victoria Rooms on the corner of Queen's Road and Whiteladies Road. Today this building houses the University of Bristol's music department. The union is currently located in the Richmond Building, Queens Road, Clifton.

The Richmond Building is one of the largest students' union buildings in Great Britain. It houses the Anson Rooms gig and performance venue; the 200-seat Winston Theatre; Burst Radio; Photography Dark Rooms; Pottery Studio; Computer Rooms; Epigram (student newspaper) and UBTV offices; various meeting rooms, study spaces and society headquarters. It is also home to the Balloon Bar.

Elected officers
Bristol SU is run by a team of seven officers who are elected by the student body annually in March. They represent students and have the job of improving the student experience at Bristol. The officer team is made up of Liberation, Equality and Access Officer, Postgraduate Education Officer, Sport and Student Development Officer, Student Living Officer, Undergraduate Education Officer, Union Affairs Officer and International Students Officer.

Activities
Bristol SU currently offers over 400 societies, sports clubs and networks covering a wide range of activities. All societies and clubs are entirely student-run by their elected committees, and are supported by the union.

See also
National Union of Students of the United Kingdom

References

External links
 Bristol SU website

Bristol
University of Bristol
Music venues in Bristol